Wegmans LPGA was women's professional golf tournament on the LPGA Tour. It was played from 1977 to 2009 at the Locust Hill Country Club in Pittsford, New York.

History
The tournament was originally known as the Bankers Trust Classic, a 54-hole event. From 1979 to 1981, Sarah Coventry took over sponsorship of the tournament, changed its title and extended it to 72 holes. While the tournament was The Sarah Coventry, the tournament didn't recognize the Bankers Trust as part of the tournament's history. Today it does and The Sarah Coventry prior to 1979 was held in Florida and California is regarded as the separate tournament. Wegmans Food Markets took over as the title sponsor in 1998.

Working with the Monroe County Rotary Clubs, tournament proceeds are donated to support local summer camps for disabled children.  Through 2005, more than $6.6 million had been raised for these charities through the Wegmans LPGA Tournament.

In 2010, the tournament was replaced by the LPGA Championship, a major championship. Wegmans served as presenting sponsor instead of Coca-Cola in 2010, as ownership of the championship reverted from McDonald's back to the LPGA.  Wegmans took over as title sponsor in 2011, with the regular (non-major) tour stop continuing on hiatus, at least through 2014. The LPGA Championship stayed in Rochester and left Locust Hill for Monroe Golf Club where it stayed until 2015. Since 2014, there has been no LPGA tournament in Rochester. In 2015 it was announced that the Symetra Tour was coming to town with the creation of the Toyota Danielle Downey Classic.

Tournament names
1977–1978: Bankers Trust Classic
1979–1981: The Sarah Coventry
1982–1997: Rochester International
1998–2001: Wegmans Rochester International
2002–2005: Wegmans Rochester LPGA
2006–2009: Wegmans LPGA

Winners

*Championship won in sudden-death playoff.

Tournament record

References

External links
LPGA official tournament microsite

Former LPGA Tour events
Golf in New York (state)
Sports in Rochester, New York
History of women in New York (state)